Shaylee Jade Curnow (born 2 April 1997), known professionally as Peach PRC, is an Australian pop singer, songwriter, and social media personality. Her major label debut single "Josh" was released in early 2021, which peaked at number 38 on the ARIA Singles Chart. Peach is a prominent figure on the social media platform TikTok, where she posts content about her life, self-care advice with ADHD and drug and alcohol abuse, and her music.

Early life
Peach was born on 2 April 1997 in Australia. Peach grew up in the southern suburbs of Adelaide, South Australia. She chose her stage name due to her love of the colour pink, as a homage to Princess Peach, using the title during her time performing as a stripper. An abbreviation for porcelain, she began using the suffix PRC on TikTok because to type out the full word would be too long.

In an interview with Echo Magazine, Peach said: "I've been interested in music for as long as I could talk, really. I've always sang and wrote songs and even have songs written from when I was like 8 years old."

In her early career, Peach acted in music videos, most notably appearing as the love interest in Ambleside's music video for "Wash Away" in 2016.

Career

2019–2020: "Blondes" and TikTok popularity
On 19 June 2019, Peach independently released her debut single "Blondes". She created a TikTok account in September 2019, subsequently attracting an audience after posting content about her life, self-care advice, and her music. Her second single "Colourblind" was released on 2 May 2020. She said that the inspiration for the song "came from [her] synaesthesia and mine happens to be with colours and music; so I wanted to write a song that involved the colours I saw when singing it."

2021–present: "Josh" and Republic Records signing
On 21 February 2021, The Music Network confirmed Peach had signed with Island Records in Australia and Republic Records in the US. Her debut major label single "Josh" was released on 26 February 2021. Discussing the song, she said: "It's very special to me, because it captured a real moment. I was a bit down when I was writing one day. My ex, Josh, kept calling me over and over again. He called all of the time, because he was trying to get back with me. I thought I had blocked him though. Since he didn't stop bothering me, I wrote the song about him. It's a true story, but it's meant to be fun and colourful." The song debuted at number 38 on the ARIA Singles Chart. On 25 June, Peach released the single "Symptomatic". On 22 October, Peach released the two-track single "I've Been Bad, Santa" / "Christmas Kinda Sucks". On 5 November, Curnow released the single "Heavy". On 10 January 2022, Curnow leaked a song on her TikTok called God Is a Freak, without telling her label. The snippet went viral and after fan demand, the song was released on 4 February 2022.

Personal life
Curnow came out as a lesbian on 13 January 2022. She had previously identified as bisexual. On 9 February 2021, she was featured on Abbie Chatfield's It's a Lot podcast, where she discussed coming to terms with her sexuality, stating; "every gay person I knew, or bi person, was like 'yeah I always knew. I've known it since I was little.' I don't remember knowing from a young age that I liked girls."

In April 2022, Curnow revealed her birth name was Sharlee, as opposed to Shaylee, after her birth name was used on an APRA Music Awards poster shared on her Instagram. Commenters were quick to point on the typo on the poster, however, Curnow replied to clear up the confusion and revealed it was the name on her birth certificate. Despite this, she continues to go by Shaylee in her personal life and is also credited professionally as Shaylee Curnow.

Curnow has been open with her battles with addiction in her TikTok videos, being especially honest on her "ritalin" Peach PRC  TikTok account her "secret" account. She would often discuss rehab visits, making light to deal with the difficult situation, going "Live" many times very drunk/stoned when manic, which has concerned many fans (especially when she released the single Forever Drunk after a recent and publicised stint in rehabilitation). Fans have questioned if Curnow's manager, label and support group are enabling the concerning behaviour. Curnow often posts videos on TikTok of her battle with ADHD, including hyper-fixating  on crafts and snails, talking about auditory hallucinations  and helpful self-care videos including encouraging fans to brush their teeth. She uses these symptoms are an influence for her song "Symptomatic", though some fans were troubled with the album cover art, saying it was in poor taste to show Curnow in a straight jacket and padded room.

Curnow's honesty with her troubling body image has led some to believe she may be battling undiagnosed body dysmorphia, posting about her filler injections and procedures on her chin and lips as well as negative self-talk in her TikToks and Twitter.

Relationship with Alex Williamson
On 28 April 2021, Curnow made a post on social media, alleging abusive and predatory behaviour by her former boyfriend, Australian comedian Alex "Shooter" Williamson. Williamson responded in a series of stories on Instagram, claiming the allegations were "horse shit" and accusing PRC of domestic violence, recounting an incident in which she allegedly tried to kick down a door while he was on the toilet. Williamson was subsequently dropped by his management a day later, and the lineup of the Perth and Sydney comedy festivals on 3 May. Williamson has rebuked all claims. Following the allegations against him, Instagram removed Williamson's profile. Williamson claimed this was the second time Curnow had attempted to "deplatform" him, after which she removed the posts. Other celebrities corroborated and supported Curnow's story, coming out with their own personal trauma with Williamson.

Public image
Curnow has been credited as one of the most successful Australian creators on TikTok, with 2 million followers and more than 100 million likes on the social media platform.

Discography

Extended plays

Singles

Music videos

Awards and nominations

APRA Awards
The APRA Awards are held in Australia and New Zealand by the Australasian Performing Right Association to recognise songwriting skills, sales and airplay performance by its members annually.

! 
|-
| 2022
| "Josh"
| Most Performed Pop Work
| 
| 
|-

Rolling Stone Australia Awards
The Rolling Stone Australia Awards are awarded annually in January or February by the Australian edition of Rolling Stone magazine for outstanding contributions to popular culture in the previous year.

! 
|-
| 2022
| Peach PRC
| Best New Artist
| 
| 
|-

References

External links 
 
 

1998 births
Living people
21st-century Australian women singers
Australian TikTokers
Australian women pop singers
Australian women singer-songwriters
Island Records artists
Lesbian singers
Lesbian songwriters
Australian lesbian musicians
Australian LGBT singers
Australian LGBT songwriters
LGBT TikTokers
Republic Records artists
LGBT YouTubers
Australian atheists